A marine band, in geology, is a bed of rock, commonly black or dark grey shale, containing an abundance of fossils of marine organisms. These strata represent episodes of flooding by seawater and are important in enabling the comparison or correlation of rock sequences in different localities.

Examples
 Maltby Marine Band – England
 Milngavie Marine Band – Scotland
 Redhall Marine Band – Scotland

See also
Marine transgression

References 

Fossils
Shale
Mudstone